The Xinfeng River (postal: Sunfung River) is a river in Guangdong Province, China and a tributary of the Dong River. Its confluence with the Dong is in Heyuan. The river is dammed by the Xinfengjiang Dam, creating the large Xinfengjiang Reservoir.

References

Rivers of Guangdong